Mário Heitor Brandão de Andrade, known as Heitor (born 2 May 1978) is a Portuguese football manager and a former player. He currently coaches Gondim-Maia.

Club career
He made his Primeira Liga debut for Beira-Mar on 24 September 2004 in a game against Vitória de Setúbal.

References

1978 births
Footballers from Porto
Living people
Portuguese footballers
Ermesinde S.C. players
F.C. Tirsense players
S.C. Beira-Mar players
Primeira Liga players
Vitória F.C. players
Liga Portugal 2 players
Portimonense S.C. players
C.D. Trofense players
F.C. Famalicão players
S.C. Salgueiros players
Portuguese football managers
Association football forwards